Mandolins and Moonlight is a 1959 West German musical romance film directed by Hans Deppe and starring Christine Görner, Claus Biederstaedt and Johanna König.

It was shot in studios in Berlin and on location in Venice. The film's sets were designed by the art director Ernst H. Albrecht.

Cast 
 Christine Görner as Susanne Peters
 Claus Biederstaedt as Robert Küfner
 Johanna König as Schwester Gisela
 Kurt Großkurth as Direktor Ferdinand Küfner
 Monika Dahlberg as Zimmermädchen Trudi
 Walter Gross as Max Krank
 Nina van Pallandt as Karin Gustafsson
 Frederik van Pallandt as Sven
 Harry Friedauer
 Herbert Hübner
 Alexander Engel
 Rex Gildo

References

Bibliography 
 Manfred Hobsch. Liebe, Tanz und 1000 Schlagerfilme. Schwarzkopf & Schwarzkopf, 1998.

External links 
 

1959 films
West German films
German romantic musical films
1950s romantic musical films
1950s German-language films
Films directed by Hans Deppe
Films set in Venice
Constantin Film films
1950s German films